This article lists census-designated places (CDPs) in the U.S. state of Wyoming. At the 2020 census, there were a total of 106 census-designated places in Wyoming.

Census-Designated Places

See also
List of municipalities in Wyoming
Index of Wyoming-related articles
Outline of Wyoming

References

External links 
: US Census Bureau

 
Census-designated places
Wyoming